C³, also known as  or Cube×Cursed×Curious, is a Japanese light novel series written by Hazuki Minase, and illustrated by Sasorigatame. C³ is about a high school student named Haruaki Yachi, who receives a mysterious black cube from his father who is overseas. That night, Haruaki is woken by a noise and is surprised to find a girl named Fear Kubrick in his kitchen eating rice crackers. Haruaki confirms that she is the cube, but knows nothing about her past other than that she has a curse on her which she wants broken. Breaking the curse though proves hard as there are organizations that seek to capture or destroy Fear, along with her dark past as a "Cursed Tool" which comes to light. Haruaki vows to protect her though, and is joined along by other allies/friends as the series progresses.

The series was later adapted into a manga, and appeared as a serial in the manga magazine Dengeki Daioh from February 26, 2011 to January 26, 2013. ASCII Media Works then published the chapters in three bound volumes. An anime adaptation came next, which aired on various networks from October 1, 2011 to December 17, 2011. Twelve episodes aired in all, excluding an OVA to the series which was later released on April 25, 2012. Funimation acquired the license to the anime for a North American release late in 2015, and the complete series along with the OVA was released in march of the following year.

Plot

The story begins with high-school student Yachi Haruaki receiving a mysterious super-heavy black cube from his overseas archaeologist father. That night, Haruaki wakes to a suspicious noise in the kitchen and discovers a stark-naked young girl with blue hair stealing rice crackers. The girl introduces herself as "Fear" (pronounced "Fia" in Japanese), and Haruaki comes to the conclusion that she is the cube that his father had sent. Fear explains that she is a Cursed Tool, objects which were used in the past by humans to fill out their evil desires. Over time they began to possess human attributes at a great price which include gaining human emotions, and hurting others without control. Haruaki assures her that he is immune to any curse that she might give him, and vows to help out by getting rid of her curse. Allied with next-door neighbour Konoha Muramasa and the strict class representative Kirika Ueno, they try to help her remove her curse, but in the process gets involved in many dangerous organisations, and other Cursed Tool incidents.

Characters
  
 

   
The male protagonist and a student at Taishu High School.  His father has a habit of sending him Cursed artifacts to remove the curses within, as their home is in a blessed location, a focal point for positive energy which gradually removes curses, and thus makes him immune to any curses. Due to the fact that his mother was never seen or mentioned in the series and his father is traveling, he developed a talent in cooking and is highly independent. He has a very stubborn but friendly personality, and does not hesitate when it comes to protecting his friends. Haruaki is somewhat aware of all the girls' feelings towards him, but never acts upon taking steps towards a serious relationship with any of them.
   
 
   

   
The female protagonist, she's actually a Cursed Tool, whose full name is Fear-In-Cube, a torture device that resembles a solid metal cube. Fear-In-Cube has 32 torture capabilities which include an Iron maiden, and a Guillotine among other things. Fear was developed during the height of the Inquisitions, and has caused countless people's agonizing deaths to the point where she risks going homicidally insane upon hearing someone scream in pain. Eventually she developed a curse of her own, causing anyone who owns her to go insane, driving the owner to want to use her to torture people and revel in their pain and screams. Due to her extended time in the depths of a Spanish castle Fear has also developed animosity for spiders, as they would build cobwebs around her original form. Out of disgust at her past, Fear prefers to stay in human form. She regards Haruaki as her owner, and her anxiety is eased by his assurances that her curse can not affect him. Fear's torture abilities are over time neutralized by things called indulgence disks which are found in other cursed tools. She appears to have a developing crush towards Haruaki but responds to him in a Tsundere type of way when she gets shy. Fear's favorite catchphrase is "I'll curse you", and has an addiction to rice crackers.
   
 
   

   
A long resident at the Yachi compound, Konoha is also a Cursed Tool in the true form of a katana. In human form, she still retains her powers of slicing clean through objects, which are her sword characteristics. Her curse towards her owner differs between adaptations but does not play an essential role in the story due to Haruaki's immunity to curses. Konoha's status as a Cursed Tool has almost been lifted, but when she sees blood for an extended period of time a relapse can occur towards a blood-thirsty personality with blue hair and eyes similar to Fear. Konoha tends more though to faint at the sight of blood as a result of hypnosis that was self induced in order to keep her blood lust from overwhelming her. She also wears special glasses to help block her vision of too much blood. Little is known of her history before the start of the story other than she is a childhood friend to Haruaki. He sometimes calls her "onee-san" (older sister) as he did when they were kids in order to obtain a special favor from her. To the outside world she and Haruaki are related cousins, and she goes to a different classroom than him. She doesn't get along well with Fear whom she refers to as a "child", and is jealous when she gets too close to Haraki due to Konoha's crush on him. She is also aware that Kirika not only loves but is a rival for him. Fear Kubrick is also jealous of her breasts, where she nicknames her "cow tits".
   
 
   

   
Kirika is a classmate of Haruaki, and is also the Student Council President. She is in possession of two Cursed Tools, one called Ginistrang's Love, and the other The River of Black Strings (or Tragic Black River). Both of these tools give her advantages in battle including the ability to not be killed by a fatal injury, though in exchange they come with terrible effects. She will die if she ever removes Ginistrang's Love which looks like a bdsm-style outfit, as for the other tool she satisfies the curse by using herself as a victim since the bondage suit will heal the injuries that Black River inflicts. Kirika feels disgusted with her body as she did not choose to have these cursed items placed upon her. She is also a reluctant member of a group founded by her older brother that has more than one name depending on the adaptation. This group studies and researches Cursed Tools as the ultimate mysteries to explore. She has a crush on Haruaki, and often competes with him over whose cooking is better during lunch period. He later finds out about her Cursed Tools, and what she must do in order to satisfy the curse of Black River. He isn't bothered by it though, and the trust further strengthens their relationship. Kirika's catchphrase is "Absolutely ridiculous!" which she uses on more than one occasion.
   
 
   

   
Kuroe is a Cursed Tool in the form of a doll who has recently returned to Haruaki's house. She is a Japanese doll with extendible hair, and chose the 'e' kanji of her name to give the impression of "pretty as a picture". Kuroe has a very friendly and calm personality but usually seems emotionless, those that know her well though like Haruaki, can tell if she's feeling a particular emotion. She can freely control her hair like tentacles or hands for many purposes such as moving things or healing others using her life energy. She recharges by running a salon where she cuts peoples hair and then feeds on the residual life energy inherent in the cut hair after closing, partly to keep her life energy up and partly because she finds the hair delicious. Due to the trust and thanks from her customers and fellow shopkeepers she has completely removed her curse. Her original curse was that she would attempt to steal her owners' life energy at night by cutting off bits of their hair, and absorbing it until they died. It is shown that Kuroe finds amusement in her practical jokes and playful flirting towards Haruaki.

Media

Light novels

Manga

The manga series started in late 2011, and is complete with a total of 3 volumes.

Anime
An anime television adaptation of C³ was announced in the April 2011 issue of ASCII Media Works's Dengeki AnimeStyle pamphlet. The series was produced by StarChild and Silver Link under the direction of Shin Oonuma with Michiko Yokote as script supervisor. The opening theme song for the 8 first episodes is "Endless Story" performed by Yukari Tamura and the ending theme song is  performed by Eri Kitamura. Funimation licensed the series in North America.

Reception
Gabriella Ekens from Anime News Network criticized the anime for its unoriginal plot and characters, though she praised its visuals and considered it an entertaining show. Tristan Crocker from Anime Herald gave a similar review, calling the story and characters underdeveloped, while at the same time deeming the show "a fun surprise".

References

External links
 

2007 Japanese novels
2011 anime television series debuts
2011 manga
2012 anime OVAs
Action anime and manga
Anime and manga based on light novels
AT-X (TV network) original programming
Comedy anime and manga
Dengeki Bunko
Dengeki Daioh
Funimation
Harem anime and manga
Kadokawa Dwango franchises
Light novels
Shōnen manga
Silver Link
Supernatural anime and manga
Television shows based on light novels